= Chetverikov house on Malaya Yakimanka =

Coordinates: 55.73799327°N 37.61736575°E

- Дом Четвериковых на Малой Якиманке
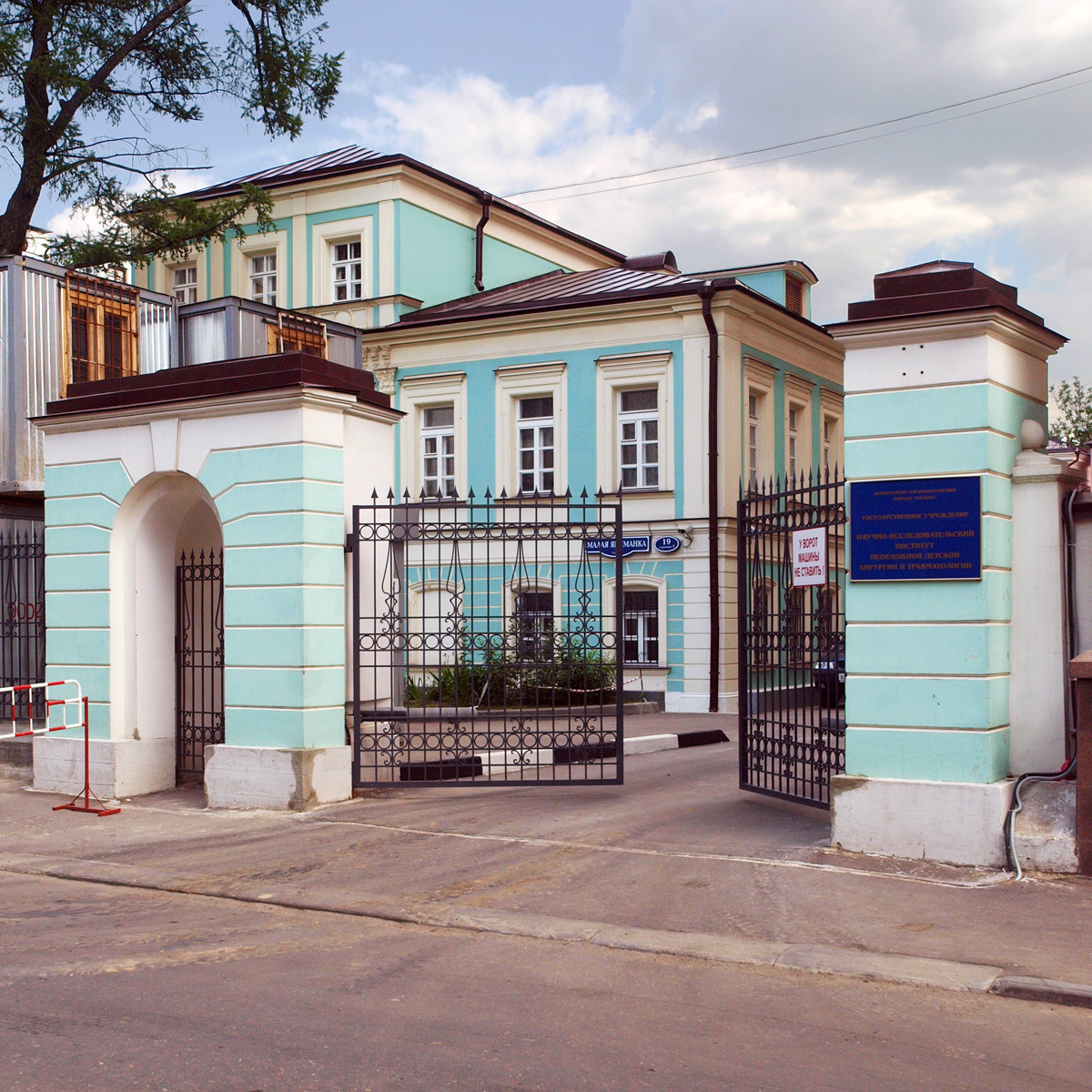
- Location: Moscow, Malaya Yakimanka street 19, building 1

Chetverikov house on Malaya Yakimanka (Russian: Дом Четвериковых на Малой Якиманке) is a house of the early 19th century, located in the center of Moscow (19, building 1, Malaya Yakimanka street). In the 2000s, it was restored. Now the building is occupied by the research Institute of emergency children's surgery and traumatology. Chetverikov house has the status of cultural heritage of Federal significance.

== History ==
The first known image of the building on Malaya Yakimanka was found on the plan of ownership of the merchant wife Tatyana Evdokimova and is dated 1772. Then it was a square in terms of one-storey stone house, covered with a closed arch. The walls of this house, built in a modern building, have been preserved, and it can be assumed that it was built in the middle of the 18th century.

In the 1800s, the owner of the mansion was a merchant Ivan Vasilyevich Chetverikov. Under him the building was rebuilt: the first floor was significantly expanded and there was a second. In 1845, a wooden mezzanine appeared near the mansion. In 1863, a two-storey building was added to the Eastern facade. At the end of the 19th century, the owner of the estate was a merchant Nikolai Osipovich Sushkin, in which new decorative elements appeared on the facades and interiors of the house. Under the Soviet regime, the mansion became one of the buildings of the children's trauma clinic № 20 Timiryazeva.

By the end of the 20th century the mansion was dilapidated, and in 1987 the project of its scientific restoration was developed, which provided for the reconstruction of the appearance of the building for 1860-1870-ies. However, this project has not been realized for a long time. The mansion was empty, homeless people settled in it, and then there was a fire.

In 2003, on the basis of children's city clinical hospital No. 20 named after K. A. Timiryazev, The research Institute of emergency children's surgery and traumatology was established, and construction of a new building began near the Chetverikov house. There were plans to demolish the Chetverikov house, construction on its place of a two-level underground Parking and the subsequent "reconstruction" of the mansion. The public actively opposed it, and as a result it was decided to carry out restoration of a mansion. Howling recreated numerous decorative elements: plaster column capitals, window frames, base, pilasters, and stucco facade brackets, pediments and corbels. The brickwork was restored. Unpreserved wooden mezzanine was rebuilt of brick. The interiors of the building were recreated from natural fragments and measurements of the 1980s. In one of the rooms on the second floor is the office of the Director of the hospital Leonid Roshal.
